Sève Qui Peut is a concept album by the French progressive rock band Ange about the French revolution, it was also a play and a ballet. It was released in 1989.

Track listing
Side One:
"Aimer / Haïr"  – 07:55
"Vivre Avec Le Cœur"  – 04:58
"Les Plaisirs Faciles"  – 04:16
"L'or, L'argent Et La Lumière"  – 07:12
Side Two:
"Briser La Glace"  – 05:32
"Les Amours-Lumières"  – 04:28
"Non !!"  – 03:56
"Grands Sentiments"  – 04:20
"Sève Qui Peut"  – 08:06

Personnel
Lead Vocals, Acoustic Guitar, Keyboards: Christian Decamps
Keyboards, Backing Vocals: Francis Decamps
Guitar, Backing Vocals: Jean-Michel Brezovar
Guitar: Robert Defer
Bass: Daniel Haas
Drums, Percussion: Jean-Pierre Guichard

Additional Musicians
Vocals [Quercus Robur]: Bruno Nion

References
Sève Qui Peut on ange-updlm 
Sève Qui Peut on www.discogs.com

Ange albums
1989 albums